Paynes Point is an unincorporated community in Ogle County, Illinois, united States and is located south of Stillman Valley and east of Oregon. The community prospered in the 1970s & 1980s.

References

External links

NACo

Unincorporated communities in Ogle County, Illinois
Unincorporated communities in Illinois